Kotki is a town in Khyber-Pakhtunkhwa, Pakistan.

Kotki may also refer to the following villages in Poland:
Kotki, Świętokrzyskie Voivodeship (south-central Poland)
Kotki, Warmian-Masurian Voivodeship (north Poland)